The Hmong American Peace Academy (HAPA) is a charter school in Milwaukee, Wisconsin, under the authority of Milwaukee Public Schools. It includes the HAPA K-8 program, and it has an affiliated high school program.

Chris Her-Xiong, Jeff Nha Yia Yang, Gwaub Thao, Jay Chong Zeb Xiong, and Dr. Douglas Vue were the co-founders of the school in 2004. HAPA was established in 2004 for Hmong-American children and other children with southeast Asian heritage. Initially it enrolled students up to fifth grade, but later extended from pre-kindergarten to eighth grade. Enrollment is about 1000 students, of whom 98 percent speak a language other than English.

An affiliated school, the International Peace Academy, is a charter high school.

Curriculum
The school provides its academic instruction in English, while it has its heritage classes in Hmong.

Programs
The school has a Saturday academy for enrichment and extra support, an extended day program, after school tutoring.

Demographics
As of 2013, 87% of students qualify for free or reduced lunch.

See also
 Hmong in Wisconsin
 Language/culture-based charter school

References

External links
 Hmong American Peace Academy Ltd.

Charter schools in Wisconsin
Educational institutions established in 2004
Education in Milwaukee
Hmong-American culture in Wisconsin
Public elementary schools in Wisconsin
2004 establishments in Wisconsin